Jane Bridge (born 4 February 1960) is a former British international judoka. and judo coach.

Judo career
Bridge came to prominence winning the gold medal at the 1976 European Judo Championships in Vienna. The following year in 1977, she became champion of Great Britain for the second time, winning the bantamweight division at the British Judo Championships. She had first won the title in 1975.

In 1978, she won her second European Judo Championships gold medal, after winning the -48kg category at the women's 1978 European Championships in Cologne. In 1980, she won her third Eureopean Championship gold but the highlight of the year was winning a gold medal at the inaugural woemn's 1980 World Judo Championships in New York. She defeated Anna de Novellis in the final of the -48kg category.

In 1982, she won a third British Championship at bantamweight.

Coaching
From 1993 to 1997 she coached the British women's judo team and currently teaches in Performance Judo at the University of Bath.

Other
After retiring from judo she lived in Paris and was once a bodyguard to Sylvester Stallone and Alain Delon.

References

External links
 

1960 births
Living people
English female judoka
People associated with the University of Bath
Sportspeople from Bath, Somerset